Cylindrarctus is a genus of ant-loving beetles in the family Staphylinidae. There are about 10 described species in Cylindrarctus.

Species
These 10 species belong to the genus Cylindrarctus:
 Cylindrarctus americanus Schaufuss, 1887
 Cylindrarctus bicornis Chandler, 1988
 Cylindrarctus crinifer Casey, 1894
 Cylindrarctus fluvialis Chandler, 1988
 Cylindrarctus longipalpis (LeConte, 1849)
 Cylindrarctus ludovicianus (Brendel, 1893)
 Cylindrarctus obrieni Chandler, 1988
 Cylindrarctus onaga Chandler, 1988
 Cylindrarctus orientalis Chandler, 1988
 Cylindrarctus seminole Chandler, 1999

References

Further reading

 
 

Pselaphinae
Articles created by Qbugbot